Nadia Johnston (born October 23, 1977) is an Australian born beach tennis player and former professional player on the WTA Tour.

Biography
Originally from the Queensland city of Maryborough, Johnston began competing on the ITF circuit in the late 1990s. In 2000 she won an ITF singles title at Tampico and a $25,000 doubles title at Mount Pleasant. She took part in the qualifying draw for the 2001 Australian Open and reached her best singles ranking that year of 314 in the world. Her professional tennis career was curtailed by a wrist injury.

Johnston, who moved to New York in 2003 to coach tennis, began touring on the professional ITF Beach Tennis Tour in 2005, winning several national titles. She now competes for the United States.

ITF finals

Singles (1–1)

Doubles (1–5)

References

External links
 
 

1977 births
Living people
Australian female tennis players
American female tennis players
Tennis people from Queensland
People from Maryborough, Queensland
Australian emigrants to the United States
21st-century American women